Samuel Williams Inge (February 22, 1817 – June 10, 1868) was an American politician and a member of the United States House of Representatives from Alabama.

Early life
Samuel Williams Inge was born on February 22, 1817, in Warren County, North Carolina. He moved to Greene County, Alabama, attended the public schools, and studied law. He was admitted to the bar.

Career
Inge commenced practice in Livingston, Alabama in Sumter County, Alabama.

He was a member of the Alabama House of Representatives in 1844 and 1845. He was elected as a Democrat to the Thirtieth and Thirty-first Congresses. He served from March 4, 1847 to March 3, 1851. During the Thirty-first Congress, he was chairman of the United States House Committee on the District of Columbia. He participated in a duel with Edward Stanly, a Representative from North Carolina, in Bladensburg near Washington, D.C., but neither was seriously injured.

He resumed the practice of law and was appointed by President Franklin Pierce as a United States attorney for the northern district of California on April 1, 1853. Samuel Williams Inge led the California delegation to the 1856 National Democratic Convention in Cincinnati, casting all of California's votes for James Buchanan to be President and for the Democratic party to endorse the establishment of a safe and speedy communication throughout California between the East and West Coasts.

Death
Inge died in San Francisco, California on June 10, 1868. He was originally interred at Calvary Cemetery before being moved to Holy Cross Cemetery in Colma, California.

References

External links

1817 births
1868 deaths
Burials at Holy Cross Cemetery (Colma, California)
Democratic Party members of the Alabama House of Representatives
United States Attorneys for the Northern District of California
American duellists
Democratic Party members of the United States House of Representatives from Alabama
19th-century American politicians